The Reptile Palace Orchestra is an eclectic worldbeat band based in Madison, Wisconsin which specializes in lounge, klezmer and other Eastern European music. It began in 1994 with a gig at the Club de Wash, and since that time has become a notable fixture in the Madison music scene. Membership has varied, but the current line-up consists of Maggie Weiser, Biff Blumfumgagnge, Seth Blair, Kia Karlen, Bill Feeny, Robert Schoville, Greg Smith and Ed Feeny, and included Sigtryggur Baldursson of Sugarcubes/Björk fame on their first 2 Omnium releases, Iguana iguana and HWY X

Worldwide sources include their Greenman Review, their Ink 19 interview by Holly Day, their Dirty Linen appearance, their Inside World Music interview by Paula E. Kirman, a 2003 cover story in Maximum Ink and an appearance in Snapshotmusic's FolkLib Index listing. They also appeared on Balkans Without Borders which benefitted the non-profit Doctors Without Borders organization.

Among the traditional Folk dance material, the group has a song dedicated to the Freshwater Drum. Boiled in Lead members Drew Miller and Robin Adnan Anders have both played with the Reptiles, and Biff has played with Boiled in Lead. The Reptiles also share membership (Kia, Greg and Geoff Brady) with Yid Vicious a notable Madison Klezmer band.

Discography
 Early Reptile, 1994, Boat Records
 On The Wings Of A Skink, 1995, Motile Music
 Hwy X. 1997, Omnium Records
 Live Field Recording, 1998, Beeftone Music
 Iguana Iguana, 1999, Omnium Records
 XOPO ! 2000, Beeftone Music
 Official Bootleg 2002, Beeftone Music
 We Know You Know, 2004, Omnium Records
 Songs and Dances of Madisonia, 2012, Omnium Records

External links
Reptile Palace Orchestra homepage
Reptiles on Myspace
The Reptile Palace Orchestra entry in the FolkLib Index
Discography on Music.com
Reptiles on Northside/Omnium Records
[ Reptiles on Allmusic]

References

Musical groups from Wisconsin
American folk musical groups
Culture of Madison, Wisconsin
American world music groups
Musical groups established in 1994